Siruvani Waterfalls and the dam named after them have located  west of Coimbatore in the Western Ghats. The reservoir at Siruvani was built for Tamil Nadu by the Kerala government with funds collected by the Tamil Nadu government to meet the drinking water requirements of Coimbatore. The gateways on either side of the road across the dam are typical of the Kerala and Tamil architectural styles. Siruvani is also home to certain tribes like the Mudugars and Irulas. The view from the falls and the dam is a tourist attraction.
 
Siruvani water is known to be one of the sweetest water in the world, with many saying that it is the world's 2nd tastiest drinking water. The sweetness of Siruvani water has been attributed to the vegetation and rocks through which the water flows in the Attapady area.

History
The government gave the approval for construction of the `masonry gravity' dam in February 1915; work did not start immediately; if one correlates the information from the Archeology Department, Tamil Nadu Water Supply and Drainage (TWAD) Board and the district gazette.
The villagers of Boluvampatti and Alandurai opposed the scheme, as they feared it would affect them. But they were convinced about the benefits of bringing Siruvani water to a town that was growing.

The construction of the dam began in 1927. Siruvani site is located in an extremely unfriendly terrain and wild animals frequented the place. So, all those engaged in construction work stayed in the guest house near Iruttu pallam. They rode to the dam site on horses with gunmen providing security. Even today, a visit to the Siruvani dam is not much different (except that one doesn't have to travel on a horse). Forest guards continue to accompany those who visit the dam. The initial cost of construction was Rs. 2,17,725 (for 23 feet). The reason for selecting the site was that it had perennial streams. The area below the Siruvani, Muthikulam falls, Gobiyaru, Solaiyaru, Pattiyaru, Veeraru and Paambaru falls, the main sources of supply were identified for construction.

There were plans to commission a hydroelectric project at Siruvani, but the move was dropped as the Pykara project in the Nilgiris was mooted at the time. Major and minor construction works continued till 1984 and the total cost was Rs. 26.12 crores.
The drawn from the dam in 1931 was 113 lakh litres for a population of more than 95,000. 
In the 1970s, the drawn was scaled down to 130 lakh litres from 186 lakh litres in the summer as inflow into the Muthikulam reduced by half.

Visitor information
Sadivayal Checkpost, where an entry fee of Rs. 50 is charged, and is at the gateway to the waterfalls. Private vehicles are not allowed beyond this point; however, vehicles arranged by the forest department can be used for the conveyance to the point where the trek is to be started. No extra charges for this service.
An almost 1 km trek-walk through the forest is required to reach the exact place for bathing.

Bus lines 59C, 59, 14E, and the Siruvani and Sadivayal buses, ply at regular intervals from Coimbatore (Gandhipuram Town bus stand). Other projects and places nearby are Parambikulam, Aliyar, Sholiyar, Palar rivers and the Anaimalai Hills range.

Gallery

References

Waterfalls of Tamil Nadu
Coimbatore district